Dancing with the Stars (댄싱 위드 더 스타) is a dance competition show airing on MBC TV in South Korea. The show is based on the British television series Strictly Come Dancing.

Cast

Presenters
Key:
 Current presenter 
 Previous presenter

Judging panel

Key:
 Current judging panel
 Previous judge(s)

Contestants

Season 1 Contestants
 Kim Yeong-cheol (actor, partnered by Lee Chae-won)
 Kim Dong-kyoo (classical singer, partnered by Lee Han-na)
 Kim Jang-hoon (rock singer, partnered by Jeong Ah-reum)
 Lee Bong-Ju (former marathoner, partnered by Choi Soo-jeong)
 Moon Hee-joon (pop/rock singer, partnered by Ahn Hye-sang)
 Oh Sang-jin (announcer, partnered by Ham Ga-yeon)
 Kim Gyu-ri (actress, partnered by Kim Kang-san)
 Park Eun-ji (entertainer, partnered by Kwon Soon-yong)
 Jessica Gomes (model, partnered by Park Ji-woo)
 Lee Seul-ah (professional Go player, partnered by Park Sang-woon)
 Hyuna (pop singer, partnered by Nam Kee-yong)

Season 2 Contestants
 Kim Hyoyeon (pop singer, partnered by Kim Hyung-suk)
 Kim Ga-young (pocket billiards/pool player, partnered by Kim Kang-san)
 Ye Ji-won (actress, partnered by Bae Ji-ho)
 Choi Yeo-jin (actress and model, partnered by Park Ji-woo)
 Shin Soo-Ji (former rhythmic gymnast, partnered by Kwon Sun-bin)
 Choi Eun-kyung (entertainer, partnered by Kim Sang-min)
 Lee Hoon (actor, partnered by Ham Ga-yeon)
 Song Chong-gug (former football player, partnered by Lee Ji-eun)
 Denis Kang (MMA fighter, partnered by Kim Soo-kyung)
 Sunwoo Jae-duk (actor, partnered by Lee Han-na)
 Kim Won-chul (architect, partnered by Son Jin-joo)
 Tony An (singer, partnered by Bae So-young)

Season 3 Contestants

 Kim Wan-sun (singer, partnered by Kim Hyung-suk)
 Lee Jong-won (actor, partnered by Lee Chae-won)
 Lee Eun-gyeol (magician, partnered by Lee Jung-hyun)
 Kim Kyung-ho (rock singer, partnered by Ahn Hye-sang)
 Oh Mi-hee (actress, partnered by Kim Sang-min)
 Fei (pop singer, partnered by Kim Su-ro)
 Nam Bo-ra (actress, partnered by Kwon Sun-yong)
 Hye Park (model, partnered by Zegna)
 Woo Ji-Won (former basketball player, partnered by Choi Song-hwa)
 Seungho (pop singer, partnered by Son Jin-joo)
 Jeanette Lee (pool player, partnered by Lee Hoo-sun)
 Kim Dae-ho (announcer, partnered by Choi Soo-jeong)

Series overview

References 

South Korea
South Korean television series based on British television series
MBC TV original programming
2011 South Korean television series debuts